Yuri Nikolaevich Baulin (October 5, 1933 – December 5, 2006) (also spelled: Yury) was an ice hockey player who played for the Soviet national team. He won a bronze medal at the 1960 Winter Olympics.

Biography
Yuri Baulin began to play hockey in 1952 with Spartak Moscow, but in 1953 joined CSKA Moscow, playing there until 1962. He then played with SKA Leningrad (1962–64) and ended his playing career in 1964-65 with Torpedo Ust-Kamenogorsk. Baulin won Soviet titles six times (1955, 1956 and 1958–61). Internationally, besides his Olympic bronze, Baulin won silver (1959) and bronze (1960) at the World Championships and was European Champion in 1959 and 1960. After his playing career ended, Baulin worked as a hockey coach. At first he was the head coach of Torpedo Ust-Kamenogorsk, then worked as a coach with Spartak Moscow in 1971-72, winning a bronze medal at the 1972 Soviet Championships. In 1970-71 he was the head coach of the Soviet national junior team, which included such future stars as Vladislav Tretyak, Helmūts Balderis and Aleksandr Golikov, and Baulin won two World Junior Championship with them. After that he was a long-time coach of Yenbek Alma-Ata until his retirement in the late 1980s.

References

External links

1933 births
2006 deaths
HC CSKA Moscow players
HC Spartak Moscow players
Honoured Masters of Sport of the USSR
Ice hockey players at the 1960 Winter Olympics
Kazzinc-Torpedo head coaches
Kazzinc-Torpedo players
Medalists at the 1960 Winter Olympics
Olympic bronze medalists for the Soviet Union
Olympic ice hockey players of the Soviet Union
Olympic medalists in ice hockey
SKA Saint Petersburg players
Soviet ice hockey defencemen
Ice hockey people from Moscow